Danilo Baltierra Cravia (born October 4, 1968) is a Uruguayan former footballer who played for clubs in Uruguay, Chile and Spain.

Titles
 Peñarol 1993, 1994, 1995 and 1996 (Uruguayan Primera División Championship)
 Nacional 1998 (Uruguayan Primera División Championship)

References
 
 Profile at Tenfield Digital 

1968 births
Living people
Footballers from Montevideo
Uruguayan footballers
Uruguayan expatriate footballers
Club Nacional de Football players
Peñarol players
C.A. Cerro players
C.A. Progreso players
Villa Española players
C.A. Rentistas players
CD Logroñés footballers
O'Higgins F.C. footballers
Chilean Primera División players
Expatriate footballers in Chile
Expatriate footballers in Spain
Association football midfielders
C.A. Cerro managers